Fatih Öztürk (born 22 December 1986) is a French professional footballer of Turkish descent who plays as a goalkeeper, most recently for Süper Lig club Galatasaray.

Career
On 10 May 2018, Öztürk helped Akhisar Belediyespor win their first professional trophy, the 2017–18 Turkish Cup.

On June 17, 2019 he has signed a 2 year contract with another Süper Lig side Kasımpaşa.

Honours
Akhisarspor
 Turkish Cup: 2017-18
 Turkish Super Cup: 2018

References

External links

 
 TFF Profile

1986 births
Living people
People from Phalsbourg
Sportspeople from Moselle (department)
French footballers
Association football goalkeepers
Trabzonspor footballers
Akhisarspor footballers
Süper Lig players
Kasımpaşa S.K. footballers
Galatasaray S.K. footballers
French people of Turkish descent
French expatriate footballers
Footballers from Grand Est
French expatriate sportspeople in Turkey
Expatriate footballers in Turkey